Events from the year 1691 in France

Incumbents
 Monarch – Louis XIV

Events
 
18 September – Battle of Leuze

Births

Full date missing
Gaston-Laurent Coeurdoux, Jesuit missionary (died 1779)
Charles d'Orléans de Rothelin, clergyman (died 1744)
Joseph-Charles Roettiers, engraver and medalist (died 1779)
François Alexandre Pierre de Garsault, botanist, zoologist and painter (died 1778)

Deaths

Full date missing
Jean Petitot, painter (born 1607)
Jean-Jacques Renouard de Villayer, member of the Conseil d'État (born 1607)

See also

References

1690s in France